Rendlesham is a village and civil parish near Woodbridge, Suffolk, United Kingdom.

Rendlesham may also refer to:
 Baron Rendlesham, a title in the Peerage of Ireland
 Peter Thellusson, 1st Baron Rendlesham (17611808), British merchant, banker and politician
 Frederick Thellusson, 4th Baron Rendlesham (17981852), British politician
 Frederick Thellusson, 5th Baron Rendlesham (18401911), British politician
 Clare Rendlesham (died 1987), British fashion editor and boutique manager
 HMS Rendlesham, a Ham-class minesweeper of the Royal Navy
 Rendlesham Forest, a mixed woodland in Suffolk near Rendlesham
 The Rendlesham Forest incident, a series of reported sightings of unexplained lights and the alleged landing of a craft or multiple craft in Rendlesham Forest
 Rendlesham Hall, a manor house in Rendlesham
 Rendlesham Hurdle, a British National Hunt hurdle race

See also 
 Rendelsham, South Australia, a town